Dǒumǔ, also known as Dǒumǔ Yuánjūn ( "Lady Mother of the Chariot"), Dòulǎo Yuánjūn ( "Lady Ancestress of the Chariot") and Tàiyī Yuánjūn ( "Lady of the Great One"), is a goddess in Chinese religion and Taoism. She is also named through the honorific Tiānhòu ( "Queen of Heaven"), shared with other Chinese goddesses, especially Mazu, who are perhaps conceived as her aspects. Other names of her are Dàomǔ ( "Mother of the Way") and Tiānmǔ ( "Mother of Heaven").

She is the feminine aspect of the cosmic God of Heaven. The seven stars of the Big Dipper, in addition to two not visible to the naked eye, are conceived as her sons, the Jiǔhuángshén ( "Nine God-Kings"), themselves regarded as the ninefold manifestation of Jiǔhuángdàdì ("Great Deity of the Nine Kings") or Dòufù ( "Father of the Great Chariot"), another name of the God of Heaven. She is therefore both wife and mother of the God of Heaven. In certain Taoist accounts she is identified as the ambiguous goddess of life and death Xiwangmu.

In religious doctrines

Taoist esotericism
In the esoteric teachings of Taoism she is identified as the same as Jinling Shengmu, Jiutian Xuannü ( "Mysterious Lady of the Nine Heavens") and Xiwangmu ( "Queen Mother of the West"), representing the mother of the immortal "red infant" ( chìzǐ) Dao enshrined at the centre of the human body. This links her directly to the myths about the birth and initiation of Laozi and the Yellow Emperor (whose mother Fubao became pregnant of him after she was aroused after she saw a lightning from, or turning around, the Big Dipper), as attested, among others, by Ge Hong (283-343).

Buddhist interpretation
In Vajrayana traditions of Chinese Buddhism (Tangmi), Doumu was conflated with Bodhisattva Marici at least by the Tang dynasty. Marici too is described as the mother of the Way and the Dipper, at the centre of Brahma's Heaven of primal energy. Marici's chariot is pulled by seven boars. Ironically, the incantation used in the Taoist scripture dedicated to Doumu is the same as one of the longer Buddhist dharanis used for Marici, but with eight verses in Han Chinese added in the beginning to praise her.

Artistic depictions

See also

 Tai Sui
 Nine Emperor Gods Festival
 Chinese theology
 Big Dipper

Other goddesses identified with the Great Chariot
 Ungnyeo
 Ninlil
 Ninhursag

References

Citations

Sources
  Volume I: The Ancient Eurasian World and the Celestial Pivot, Volume II: Representations and Identities of High Powers in Neolithic and Bronze China, Volume III: Terrestrial and Celestial Transformations in Zhou and Early-Imperial China.
 
  Two volumes: 1) A-L; 2) L-Z.
 

Chinese goddesses
Solar goddesses
Deities in Taoism